Theodore Reed "T. R." Fehrenbach, Jr. (January 12, 1925 – December 1, 2013) was an American historian, columnist, and the former head of the Texas Historical Commission (1987-1991). He graduated from Princeton University in 1947  and wrote more than twenty books, including the bestseller Lone Star: A History of Texas and Texans and This Kind of War, about the Korean War. Senator John McCain called this book “perhaps the best book ever written on the Korean War”. Secretary of Defense James Mattis said “There’s a reason I recommended T.R. Fehrenbach’s book...that we all pull it out and read it one more time.”

Although he served as a U.S. Army officer during the Korean War, his own service is not mentioned in the book. Fehrenbach also wrote for Esquire, The Atlantic, The Saturday Evening Post, and The New Republic. He wrote popular histories of Texas, Mexico, and the Comanche people. For almost 30 years, he wrote a weekly column on Sundays for the San Antonio Express-News.  On August 23, 2013, T.R. Fehrenbach announced that he would retire from writing columns because of declining health. T.R. Fehrenbach died of a congenital heart defect at Northeast Baptist Hospital in San Antonio on December 1, 2013.

Selected bibliography
U. S. Marines In Action, 1962, . Republished in 2000, 
This Kind of War: A Study In Unpreparedness 1963, .  Republished in 1998 as This Kind Of War: The Classic Korean War History , 
Crossroads in Korea, the Historic Siege of Chipyong-Ni, 1966, 
The Gnomes of Zurich, 1966, 
The Swiss Banks, 1966, 
This Kind Of Peace, 1966, 
FDR's Undeclared War, 1939–1941, 1967, 
Greatness to Spare: The Heroic Sacrifices of the Men Who Signed the Declaration of Independence, 1968,  .  Republished in 2000, 
The Fight for Korea: from the War of 1950 to the Pueblo Incident, 1969, 
The United Nations in war and peace, 1968, 
Lone Star: A History of Texas and the Texans, 1968, .  Republished in 2000, 
Fire And Blood: A History Of Mexico, 1973, . Republished in 1995, 
Comanches: The Destruction of a People, 1974, . Republished in 2003 as Comanches: The History of a People, 
Seven Keys To Texas, 1983, 
Texas: A Salute from Above, 1985, 

Sources for book publication data: United States Library of Congress, Amazon.com.

T. R. Fehrenbach Award
The Texas Historical Commission gives this award to recognize books about Texas history and pre-history.  The award is given annually.

References

Sources
Fehrenbach, T. R., Comanches: The Destruction of a People, Knopf, New York, 1974

External links
Interview with T. R. Fehrenbach, May 30, 2001. University of Texas at San Antonio: Institute of Texan Cultures: Oral History Collection, UA 15.01, University of Texas at San Antonio Libraries Special Collections.
 
 

1925 births
2013 deaths
American military writers
Historians of Texas
Historians of the Texas Revolution
Historians of Mexico
Historians of the United States
American military historians
Princeton University alumni
20th-century American historians

United States Army personnel of the Korean War
United States Army officers
Writers from San Antonio
People from San Benito, Texas
20th-century American male writers
American male non-fiction writers
Historians from Texas
Military personnel from Texas